Nothobranchius fuscotaeniatus is a species of killifish in the family Nothobranchiidae. It is endemic to Tanzania.

References

Links
 Nothobranchius fuscotaeniatus on WildNothos

fuscotaeniatus
Endemic freshwater fish of Tanzania
Fish described in 1997
Taxa named by Lothar Seegers
Taxonomy articles created by Polbot